Gamewell is a town in Caldwell County, North Carolina, United States. The population was 4,051 at the 2010 census. It is part of the Hickory–Lenoir–Morganton Metropolitan Statistical Area.

History
Gamewell was incorporated as a town June 23, 1981.

Geography
It is bordered on the northeast by the city of Lenoir, the county seat. U.S. Route 64 passes through the town, leading northeast into Lenoir and southwest  to Morganton.

Gamewell is located in the valley of Lower Creek, a southwestward-flowing tributary of the Catawba River.

Demographics

2020 census

As of the 2020 United States census, there were 3,702 people, 1,545 households, and 1,112 families residing in the town.

2000 census
As of the census of 2000, there were 3,644 people, 1,501 households, and 1,116 families residing in the town. The population density was 458.8 people per square mile (177.2/km2). There were 1,615 housing units at an average density of 203.3 per square mile (78.5/km2). The racial makeup of the town was 94.10% White, 3.92% African American, 0.25% Native American, 0.11% Asian, 0.99% from other races, and 0.63% from two or more races. Hispanic or Latino of any race were 1.37% of the population.

There were 1,501 households, out of which 27.9% had children under the age of 18 living with them, 57.7% were married couples living together, 12.7% had a female householder with no husband present, and 25.6% were non-families. 22.3% of all households were made up of individuals, and 8.2% had someone living alone who was 65 years of age or older. The average household size was 2.43 and the average family size was 2.80.

In the town, the population was spread out, with 21.4% under the age of 18, 8.6% from 18 to 24, 29.3% from 25 to 44, 27.5% from 45 to 64, and 13.1% who were 65 years of age or older. The median age was 39 years. For every 100 females, there were 101.2 males. For every 100 females age 18 and over, there were 97.0 males.

The median income for a household in the town was $39,225, and the median income for a family was $43,167. Males had a median income of $26,654 versus $22,039 for females. The per capita income for the town was $16,536. About 7.0% of families and 9.9% of the population were below the poverty line, including 16.9% of those under age 18 and 7.6% of those age 65 or over.

References

Towns in Caldwell County, North Carolina